Mikud may refer to:

 Mikud (Bagrut) - the specific material of each matriculation examination in Israel, from the entire material which is taught on that subject. 
 Mikud (company) - Israeli security and maintenance company.